Rod Hay (born August 27, 1947 – died November 30, 2019) was an English filmmaker who worked in Australia and South Africa. He started off as an actor, then as an assistant director and editor on many features, before becoming a writer, producer, director.

He lived and worked in South Africa for eight years.

He also wrote Catch Me If You Can, a biography of Darcy Dugan.

Select Credits
A Connecticut Yankee in King Arthur's Court (1970) (TV movie) - editor
Tales of Washington Irving (1970) (TV movie) - editor
Night of Fear (1972) - executive producer
Spyforce (1972–73) - editor
Inn of the Damned (1975) - producer, editor
Mama's Gone A-Hunting (1975) (TV movie) - editor
Lost in the Wild (1976) - editor
Plugg (1977) - producer, editor
Dot and the Kangaroo (1977) - editor
Gone to Ground (1978) - editor
The Little Convict (1979) - editor
A Way of Life (1981) - writer/producer/director
Will to Win (1982) - writer/producer/director
Stoney the One and Only (1983) - writer/producer/director
Don't Stop the Music (1984) - writer/producer/director
Bad Company (1985) - writer/producer/director/editor
Dot and Keeto (1986) - editor
Strike Force (1986) - writer/producer/director
Dot and the Whale (1986) - editor
Dot Goes to Hollywood (1987) - editor
Dot and the Smugglers (1987) - editor
Breaking Loose (1988) - writer/producer/director
Escape: World Safari III (1988) - editor/second unit director
Run Away (1990) - producer
The Magic Riddle (1991) - editor
Sleeping Giants (1994) (documentary) - writer/editor/director
Champions of the World (1996) (documentary) - writer/producer/director  series
A Change of Heart (1998) - writer/producer/director
Height of Passion (2000) (documentary) - writer/producer/director  series
How much is Enough (2007) - writer/producer/director  series

References

External links

Rod Hay at Screen Australia

Australian directors
English directors
1947 births
Living people